The epithet "the Generous" may refer to:

Bolesław II the Generous (c. 1041/2–1081 or 1082), third king of Poland
Bolesław III the Generous (1291–1352), Duke of Legnica, Brzeg and Wroclaw
Otto II, Margrave of Brandenburg (after 1147–1205)
Leopold, Duke of Bavaria (c. 1108–1141)

See also
List of people known as the Magnanimous

Lists of people by epithet